Araucarivora is a monotypic moth genus in the family Elachistidae. Its only species, Araucarivora gentilii, is found in Argentina. Both the genus and species were described by Ronald W. Hodges in 1997.

References

Moths described in 1997
Parametriotinae
Monotypic moth genera